The Jingtong Coal Memorial Park is a former coal mine in Jingtong, Pingxi District, New Taipei, Taiwan.

History
The area used to be the underground coal mining site. The coal used to be transported to the surface through an inclined tunnel.

Transportation
The memorial park is accessible within walking distance north of Jingtong Station of Taiwan Railways.

See also
 Mining in Taiwan

References

Former coal mines in Taiwan
Tourist attractions in New Taipei